The 1030s BC is a decade which lasted from 1039 BC to 1030 BC.

Events and trends
 1039 BC—Neferkare Amenemnisu, king of Egypt, dies.
 c. 1039 BC—End of the Rebellion of the Three Guards in China. King Cheng subdues the hostile kingdom of Yan near the Bohai Sea, the last group opposed to the Zhou dynasty.
 1031 BC—Shalmaneser II becomes King of Assyria
 c. 1030 BC—The Belknap Volcano erupts in the State of Oregon.

Significant people
1037 BC—David born